Demographic features of the population of North Macedonia include population density, ethnicity, education level, health of the populace, economic status, religious affiliations and other aspects of the population.

Total population

International statistics and estimates
According to statistics from the European Union, the actual population has been reduced by at least 230,000 people who emigrated into European Union member states between 1998 and 2011. Further Albanian news sources estimated at October 2012 that the real population is closer to the sum of 1,744,237 people who are accounted within all of the health funds of the country. According to Bozhidar Dimitrov, the Bulgarian authorities have granted 87,000 to many of those emigrants a Bulgarian passport, as of 2012, which requires that they declare to be ethnic Bulgarians. Since Bulgaria's entry into the European Union, and under pressure from fellow European Union members, Bulgaria imposed more stringent rules and measures for the acquisition of a Bulgarian citizenship and passport.

The provisions of the Ohrid agreement to elevate any minority language if the minority in question is above 20% of the population of any municipality into a co-official language for that municipality has created friction within the government, and between officials of different political and ethnic interests, resulting in the indefinite postponement of the census for almost twenty years until it was finally conducted in 2021.

Vital statistics

Source: State Statistical Office of the Republic of North Macedonia

Current vital statistics

Marriages and divorces

Ethnic groups
The process of industrialization and urbanization after the Second World War that caused the population growth to decrease involved the ethnic Macedonians to a greater extent than Muslims. Rates of increase were very high among rural Muslims: Turks and Torbesh (Macedonian Muslims) had rates 2.5 times those of the Macedonian majority, while Roma had rates 3 times as high. In 1994, Macedonians had a TFR of 2.07, while the TFR of others were: Albanian (2.10), Turkish (3.55), Roma (4.01), Serb (2.07), Vlachs (1.88) and Others (3.05). The TFR by religions was: Christian (2.17, with 2.20 for Catholics and 2.06 for Orthodox), Islam (4.02) and others (2.16).

However, it is unlikely that this high minority TFR has continued since then in North Macedonia, as Balkan fertility elsewhere (Albania, Bosnia and Herzegovina, Kosovo) has dropped sharply toward the European average. A more recent survey pegs Muslim fertility in North Macedonia at 1.7, versus 1.5 for non-Muslims.

In 2017, 21,754 children were born in North Macedonia. The ethnic affiliation of these newborns was: 11,260 (51.76%) Macedonian; 7,404 (34.03%) Albanian; 940 (4.32%) Turkish; 1,276 (5.87%) Roma; 40 (0.18%) Vlach; 129 (0.59%) Serbian; 213 (0.98%) Bosniaks; 492 (2,26%) other ethnic affiliation and unknown. In the school year 2016/2017 there were 192 715 students in elementary schools from which 104,756 (55%) were Macedonian, and 60,971 (32%) were Albanian, and in High schools there were 72 482 students from which 43,658 (60.1%) were Macedonian and 22 419 (30.9%) were Albanians. Furthermore, in 1999 Albanians accounted for 34.6% of newborns and 26.1% of students who finished high school in 2016, which was regulated by the Ministry of Education.

Languages

Source:

Religion

Source:

CIA World Factbook demographic statistics 
The following demographic statistics are from the CIA World Factbook, unless otherwise indicated.

Age structure
 0–14 years: 19.5% (male 210,078; female 203,106)
 15–64 years: 67.8% (male 707,298; female 696,830)
 65 years and over: 12.7% (male 97,437; female 124,661) (2004 est)

Sex ratio
 at birth: 1.08 male(s)/female
 under 15 years: 1.08 male(s)/female
 15–64 years: 1.02 male(s)/female
 65 years and over: 0.78 male(s)/female
 total population: 1 male(s)/female (2004 est.)

Infant mortality rate
 total: 11.74 deaths/1,000 live births
 female: 10.73 deaths/1,000 live births (2004 est.)
 male: 12.67 deaths/1,000 live births

Life expectancy at birth
 total population: 74.73 years
 male: 72.45 years
 female: 77.2 years (2004 est.)

Total fertility rate
 1.50 children born/woman (2015 est.)

HIV/AIDS
 adult prevalence rate: less than 0.1% (2001 est.)
 people living with HIV/AIDS: less than 100 (1999 est.)
 deaths: less than 100 (2001 est.)

Nationality
 noun: Macedonian/citizen of the Republic of North Macedonia
 adjective: Macedonian / of North Macedonia

See also

 Demographic history of North Macedonia
 Rumelia
 
 Demographics of the Kingdom of Yugoslavia
 Demographics of the Socialist Federal Republic of Yugoslavia
 Demographics of Albania
 Demographics of Bulgaria
 Demographics of Greece
 Demographics of Kosovo
 Demographics of Serbia

References

Other sources
 Statistical Yearbook of the Republic of Macedonia 2004 (CD version)

External links

 Results of the 2002 census
 CIA World Factbook entry on North Macedonia

 
Society of North Macedonia
Demographics of Yugoslavia